A&E was a Spanish and Portuguese basic cable and satellite television channel that carried reality television programming produced by A&E USA, owned by The History Channel Iberia in a joint venture between A&E Networks and AMC Networks International Iberia. It had feeds in Spanish available in Spain, and in Portuguese available in Portugal and Africa. On April 18, 2018, it was replaced by the Iberian version of Blaze.

References

Portuguese-language television stations
Television channels and stations established in 2005
Television channels and stations disestablished in 2018
Defunct television channels in Portugal
Defunct television channels in Spain
Television stations in Portugal